Mitragynine pseudoindoxyl is a rearrangement product of 7-hydroxymitragynine. It is an analgesic being more potent than morphine.

Pharmacology 
Mitragynine pseudoindoxyl is a μ opioid receptor agonist and δ opioid receptor antagonist and acts as a G protein biased agonist at μ opioid receptors and possesses a favourable side effect profile compared to conventional opioids.

See also 
 Mitraphylline

References

Indole alkaloids
Indolizidines
Mu-opioid receptor agonists
Ethers
Euphoriants
Spiro compounds
Biased ligands